Carlotta Fedeli (born 3 February 1992) is an Italian racing driver currently competing in the TCR International Series & SEAT León Cup Italy. Having previously competed in the TCR Italian Series, SEAT Ibiza Cup Italy & MINI Challenge Italy amongst others.

Racing career
Fedeli began her career in 2007 in Karting, she raced there for many seasons up until 2010. In 2011, she switched to the Italian Production Championship, she raced there up until 2012. She switched to the Italian MINI Challenge for 2012, finishing 12th in the championship standings that year. She continued in the series for 2013, however, only making 4 starts before switching to the Italian SEAT Ibiza Cup. For 2014 & 2015 she stayed in the championship, finishing 5th in the championship standings in 2015. She made a one-off appearance in the 2015 TCR Italian Series, taking two second-place finishes.

In May 2016 it was announced that she would race in the TCR International Series, driving a SEAT León Cup Racer for B.D. Racing.

In 2019, Fedeli attempted to qualify for the W Series, but failed to progress beyond the evaluation day.

Racing record

Complete TCR International Series results
(key) (Races in bold indicate pole position) (Races in italics indicate fastest lap)

References

External links
 
 

1992 births
Living people
TCR International Series drivers
Italian racing drivers
Italian female racing drivers
Racing drivers from Rome